Kobuszewski (feminine: Kobuszewska) is a Polish-language surname. Notable people with the surname include:

Jan Kobuszewski (disambiguation), multiple people
Theresa Kobuszewski (1920–2005), American baseball player

Polish-language surnames